The alveolates (meaning "pitted like a honeycomb") are a group of protists, considered a major clade and superphylum within Eukarya. They are currently grouped with the stramenopiles and Rhizaria among the protists with tubulocristate mitochondria, the group being referred to as SAR.

Characteristics
The most notable shared characteristic is the presence of cortical (near the surface) alveoli (sacs). These are flattened vesicles (sacs) arranged as a layer just under the membrane and supporting it, typically contributing to a flexible pellicle (thin skin).  In armored dinoflagellates they may contain stiff plates.  Alveolates have mitochondria with tubular cristae (invaginations), and cells often have pore-like intrusions through the cell surface. The group contains free-living and parasitic organisms, predatory flagellates, and photosynthetic organisms.

Almost all sequenced mitochondrial genomes of ciliates and apicomplexa are linear. The mitochondria almost all carry mtDNA of their own but with greatly reduced genome sizes. Exceptions are Cryptosporidium which are left with only a mitosome; ciliates; and Janouškovec et al 2013 demonstrated that Acavomonas diverged early and thus have retained some gene-encoding mtDNA. The mitochondrial genome of Babesia microti is circular. This species is also now known not to belong to either of the genera Babesia or Theileria and a new genus will have to be created for it.

History
The relationship of apicomplexa, dinoflagellates and ciliates had been suggested during the 1980s, and this was confirmed in the early 1990s by comparisons of ribosomal RNA sequences, most notably by Gajadhar et al. Cavalier-Smith introduced the formal name Alveolata in 1991, although at the time he was unconvinced that the group was monophyletic, and considered the grouping to be a paraphyletic assemblage. Many biologists prefer the use of the colloquial name 'alveolate'.

Classification
Alveolata include around nine major and minor groups. They are diverse in form, and are known to be related by various ultrastructural and genetic similarities:

Ciliates – very common protozoa with many short cilia arranged in rows, and two nuclei
Acavomonidia
Colponemidia
Dinoflagellates s.l. – mostly marine flagellates many of which have chloroplasts
Perkinsozoa
Chromerida – a marine phylum of photosynthetic protozoa
Colpodellida
Voromonadida
Apicomplexa – parasitic and secondary non-photosynthetic protozoa that lack axonemal locomotive structures except in gametes

The Acavomonidia and Colponemidia were previously grouped together as colponemids, a taxon now split because each has a distinctive organization or ultrastructural identity. The Acavomonidia are closer to the dinoflagellate/perkinsid group than the Colponemidia are. As such, the informal term "colponemids", as it stands currently, covers two non-sister groups within Alveolata: the Acavomonidia and the Colponemidia.

The Apicomplexa and dinoflagellates may be more closely related to each other than to the ciliates.  Both have plastids, and most share a bundle or cone of microtubules at the top of the cell.  In apicomplexans this forms part of a complex used to enter host cells, while in some colorless dinoflagellates it forms a peduncle used to ingest prey.  Various other genera are closely related to these two groups, mostly flagellates with a similar apical structure.  These include free-living members in Oxyrrhis and Colponema, and parasites in Perkinsus, Parvilucifera, Rastrimonas and the ellobiopsids.  In 2001, direct amplification of the rRNA gene in marine picoplankton samples revealed the presence of two novel alveolate linages, called group I and II.  Group I has no cultivated relatives, while group II is related to the dinoflagellate parasite Amoebophrya, which was classified until now in the Syndiniales dinoflagellate order.

Some studies suggested the haplosporids, mostly parasites of marine invertebrates, might belong here, but they lack alveoli and are now placed among the Cercozoa.

The ellobiopsids are of uncertain relation within the alveolates. Silberman et al 2004 establish that the Thalassomyces genus of ellobiopsids are alveolates using phylogenetic analysis, however  no more certainty exists on their place.

Phylogeny
Based on a compilation of the following works.

Recent research indicates that the Dinoflagelllata actually emerged in the Perkinsea. Furthermore, the Perkinsea emerged in the Apicomplexa.

Taxonomy
Alveolata Cavalier-Smith 1991 [Alveolatobiontes]
 Phylum Ciliophora Doflein 1901 stat. n. Copeland 1956 [Ciliata Perty 1852; Infusoria Bütschli 1887; Ciliae, Ciliozoa, Cytoidea, Eozoa, Heterocaryota, Heterokaryota]
 Subphylum Postciliodesmatophora Gerassimova & Seravin 1976
 Class Heterotrichea Stein 1859
 Class Karyorelictea Corliss 1974
 Subphylum Intramacronucleata Lynn 1996
 Class ?Mesodiniea Chen et al. 2015
 Infraphylum Lamellicorticata
 Class Litostomatea Small & Lynn 1981
 Class Armophorea Lynn 2004
 Class Cariacotrichea Orsi et al. 2011
 Class Spirotrichea Bütschli 1889
 Infraphylum Ventrata Cavalier-Smith 2004 [Conthreep Lynn 2012]
 Order ?Discotrichida Chen et al. 2015
 Class Protocruziea Chen et al. 2015 [Protocruziidia de Puytorac, Grain & Mignot 1987]
 Class Colpodea Small & Lynn 1981
 Class Nassophorea Small & Lynn 1981
 Class Phyllopharyngea de Puytorac et al. 1974
 Class Prostomatea Schewiakoff 1896
 Class Plagiopylea Small & Lynn 1985 sensu Lynn 2008
 Class Oligohymenophorea de Puytorac et al. 1974
 Phylum Miozoa Cavalier-Smith 1987
 Subphylum Colponemidia Tikhonenkov, Mylnikov & Keeling 2013
 Class Colponemea Cavalier-Smith 1993
 Subphylum Acavomonadia Tikhonenkov et al. 2014
 Class Acavomonadea Tikhonenkov et al. 2014
 Subphylum Myzozoa Cavalier-Smith 2004
 Infraphylum Apicomplexa Levine 1970 emend. Adl et al. 2005
 Order ?Vitrellida Cavalier-Smith 2017
 Class ?Myzomonadea Cavalier-Smith & Chao 2004 sensu Ruggiero et al. 2015
 Class Chromerea
 Order Colpodellida Patterson & Zölffel 1991 [Spiromonadida Krylov & Mylnikov 1986]
 Superclass Sporozoa Leuckart 1879 stat. nov. Cavalier-Smith 2013  [Gamontozoa]
 Class Blastogregarinida Chatton & Villeneuve 1936 [Blastogregarinina; Blastogregarinorina Chatton & Villeneuve 1936]
 Class Paragregarea Cavalier-Smith 2014
 Class Gregarinomorphea Grassé 1953
 Class Coccidiomorphea Doflein 1901
 Infraphylum Dinozoa Cavalier-Smith 1981 emend. 2003
 Order ?Acrocoelida Cavalier-Smith & Chao 2004
 Order ?Rastromonadida Cavalier-Smith & Chao 2004
 Class Squirmidea Norén 1999 stat. nov. Cavalier-Smith 2014
 Superclass Perkinsozoa Norén et al. 1999 s.s.
 Class Perkinsea Levine 1978 [Perkinsasida Levine 1978]
 Superclass Dinoflagellata Butschli 1885 stat. nov. Cavalier-Smith 1999 sensu Cavalier-Smith 2013 [Dinozoa Cavalier-Smith 1981]
 Class Pronoctilucea
 Class Ellobiopsea Cavalier-Smith 1993 [Ellobiophyceae Loeblich III 1970; Ellobiopsida Whisler 1990]
 Class Myzodinea Cavalier-Smith 2017
 Class Oxyrrhea Cavalier-Smith 1987
 Class Syndinea Chatton 1920 s.l. [Syndiniophyceae Loeblich III 1970 s.s.; Syndina Cavalier-Smith]
 Class Endodinea Cavalier-Smith 2017
 Class Noctiluciphyceae Fensome et al. 1993 [Noctilucae Haeckel 1866; Noctilucea Haeckel 1866 stat. nov.; Cystoflagellata Haeckel 1873 stat. nov. Butschli 1887]
 Class Dinophyceae Pascher 1914 [Peridinea Ehrenberg 1830 stat. nov. Wettstein]

Development
The development of plastids among the alveolates is intriguing. Cavalier-Smith proposed the alveolates developed from a chloroplast-containing ancestor, which also gave rise to the Chromista (the chromalveolate hypothesis). Other researchers have speculated that the alveolates originally lacked plastids and possibly the dinoflagellates and Apicomplexa acquired them separately. However, it now appears that the alveolates, the dinoflagellates, the Chromerida and the heterokont algae acquired their plastids from a red alga with evidence of a common origin of this organelle in all these four clades.

Evolution
A Bayesian estimate places the evolution of the alveolate group at ~. The Alveolata consist of Myzozoa, Ciliates, and Colponemids. In other words, the term Myzozoa, meaning "to siphon the contents from prey", may be applied informally to the common ancestor of the subset of alveolates that are neither ciliates nor colponemids. Predation upon algae is an important driver in alveolate evolution, as it can provide sources for endosymbiosis of novel plastids.  The term Myzozoa is therefore a handy concept for tracking the history of the alveolate phylum.

The ancestors of the alveolate group may have been photosynthetic. The ancestral alveolate probably possessed a plastid. Chromerids, apicomplexans, and peridinin dinoflagellates have retained this organelle. Going one step even further back, the chromerids, the peridinin dinoflagellates and the heterokont algae have been argued to possess a monophyletic plastid lineage in common, i.e. acquired their plastids from a red alga, and so it seems likely that the common ancestor of alveolates and heterokonts was also photosynthetic.

In one school of thought the common ancestor of the dinoflagellates, apicomplexans, Colpodella, Chromerida, and Voromonas was a myzocytotic predator with two heterodynamic flagella, micropores, trichocysts, rhoptries, micronemes, a polar ring and a coiled open sided conoid. While the common ancestor of alveolates may also have possessed some of these characteristics, it has been argued that Myzocytosis was not one of these characteristics, as ciliates ingest prey by a different mechanism.

An ongoing debate concerns the number of membranes surrounding the plastid across apicomplexans and certain dinoflagellates, and the origin of these membranes. This ultrastructural character can be used to group organisms and if the character is in common, it can imply that phyla had a common photosynthetic ancestor. On the basis that apicomplexans possess a plastid surrounded by four membranes, and that peridinin dinoflagellates possess a plastid surrounded by three membranes, Petersen et al. have been unable to rule out that the shared stramenopile-alveolate plastid could have been recycled multiple times in the alveolate phylum, the source being stramenopile-alveolate donors, through the mechanism of ingestion and endosymbiosis.

Ciliates are a model alveolate, having been genetically studied in great depth over the longest period of any alveolate lineage. They are unusual among eukaryotes in that reproduction involves a micronucleus and a macronucleus. Their reproduction is easily studied in the lab, and made them a model eukaryote historically. Being entirely predatory and lacking any remnant plastid, their development as a phylum illustrates how predation and autotrophy are in dynamic balance and that the balance can swing one way or other at the point of origin of a new phylum from mixotrophic ancestors, causing one ability to be lost.

References

External links

 Tree of Life: Alveolates

 
Infrakingdoms
Taxa named by Thomas Cavalier-Smith